The 1940 AFL season was the first season of the third American Football League. The league was formed when the New York Yankees, Boston Bears, and Buffalo Indians were joined by the Cincinnati Bengals, Columbus Bullies, and Milwaukee Chiefs of the minor American Professional Football Association (the mass defection doomed the minor league). After the announcement of the formation of the AFL (July 14, 1940), applications for membership by former APFA members St. Louis Gunners and Kenosha Cardinals were rejected by the upstart league, which started with six members.

The Columbus Bullies were declared league champions after compiling an 8-1-1 record, just edging the 7-2 of the Milwaukee Chiefs.

Final standings 
W = Wins, L = Losses, T = Ties, Pct.= Winning Percentage, PF = Points for, PA = Points against

Final 1940 standings

The standings include two forfeits: Buffalo forfeited to New York due to the field being deemed unplayable on November 17, 1940, while Cincinnati forfeited to Buffalo on November 24, 1940 due to injuries leaving the Bengals unable to field a team.

1940 All-League Team

The league's coaches selected the all-league team:

References

See also 
1940 NFL season
1941 American Football League season

American Football League Season, 1940
American Football League (1940)